Heat Wave is a 1990 American thriller-drama television film about the 1965 Los Angeles Watts Riots, directed by Kevin Hooks and starring Blair Underwood, Cicely Tyson, James Earl Jones, Margaret Avery, and David Strathairn.

Cast
 Blair Underwood as Robert Richardson
 Cicely Tyson as Ruthana Richardson
 James Earl Jones as Junius Johnson
 Margaret Avery as Roxie Turpin
 David Strathairn as Bill Thomas
 Glenn Plummer as J.T. Turpin
 Vondie Curtis-Hall as Clifford Turpin
 Paris Vaughan as Lada
 Adam Arkin as Art Berman
 Charlie Korsmo as 12-year-old Jason
 Sally Kirkland as Mrs. Canfield
 Mark Rolston as Officer Zekanis
 Robert Hooks as Reverend Brooks 
 T.E. Russell as Dominique Freeman

Awards and nominations
CableACE Awards
 Actress in a Movie or Miniseries – Cicely Tyson – won
 Editing a Dramatic or Theatrical Special/Movie or Miniseries – Debra Neil – won
 Movie or Miniseries – Jon Avnet, Jordan Kerner, Steve Golin, and Sigurjón Sighvatsson – won
 Supporting Actor in a Movie or Miniseries – James Earl Jones – won
 Directing a Movie or Miniseries – Kevin Hooks – nominated

Emmy Award
 Outstanding Supporting Actor in a Miniseries or a Special – James Earl Jones – won

Writers Guild of America
 Original Long Form – Michael Lazarou – nominated

External links
 

1990 films
1990 television films
1990 drama films
1990 thriller films
1990s thriller drama films
American thriller drama films
American thriller television films
American films based on actual events
African-American drama films
Drama films based on actual events
American drama television films
Films directed by Kevin Hooks
Films scored by Thomas Newman
Films set in 1965
Films set in Los Angeles
Films shot in Los Angeles
Television films based on actual events
Thriller films based on actual events
TNT Network original films
1990s English-language films
1990s American films